East Thorndike is a village in Waldo County, Maine, United States.  Its elevation is 531 feet (162 m).

References

Villages in Waldo County, Maine
Villages in Maine